Service Wali Bahu (Translation: "Working Daughter-in-law"; international Title: Bride With Benefits) is an  Indian television drama show, which premiered on 23 February 2015 and It airs on Zee TV. The show produced by Raakesh Paswan, under Village Boy Production. The show starring with Abhishek Rawat and Kratika Sengar in lead roles. The show also feature Akshara Singh, Vineet Kumar Chaudhary, Atul Srivastava, Pratichee Mishra, Ramakanth Daayama and Meena Mir in pivotal roles.

Cast
Abhishek Rawat as Dev Jogeshwar Prasad
Kratika Sengar Dheer as Payal Dev Prasad
Vineet Kumar Chaudhary as Ayodhya Prasad
Atul Srivastava as Jogeshwar Prasad(Natru), Payal's Father-in-law/Dev's Father
Akshara Singh as Gulkand Ayodhya Prasad
Rammakanth Daayama as Bhuvneshwar Rai, Payal's Father
Pratichee Mishra as Santoshi Prasad, Payal's Mother-in-law
Meena Mir as Indu Rai
Rocky Verma as Dubeyji (Secretary)

Production and casting
The show is produced by Raakesh Paswan, under his own Village Boy Productions. The show feature actors Abhishek Rawat and Kratika Sengar in lead roles. Actor Abhishek Rawat is playing the role of Dev, a jobless person, And actress Kratika Sengar is playing the role of Payal, a civil engineer. The show also feature actors in pivotal roles; Bhojpuri actress Akshara Singh, who is playing Payal's sister-in-law, Gulkand, And actor Vineet Kumar Chaudhary is playing Ayodhya, Gulkand's husband, And actors Atul Srivastava and Pratichee Mishra is playing Dev's parents Jogeshwar and Santoshi Prasad, And Ramakanth Daayama and Meena Mir is playing Payals' parents Bhubneshwar and Indu Rai.

The show was promoted in Delhi on 20 February 2015.

References

External links

2015 Indian television series debuts
Zee TV original programming